Georg Wilhelm "William" Eduard Schmidt von der Launitz (Born Launitz; , tr. ; 1802) was a Baltic German general in the serve of the Imperial Russian Army. Launitz was noted for being a strict and disciplined commander, and thanks to his effort, many of his troops’ living conditions were improved. Launitz also served as the first commander of the Kharkov Military District from August 1864 before dying from falling of his horse in October of the same year.

Biography

Origin 
Georg Wilhelm Eduard von der Launitz was born on  into the family of Christian Friedrich Launitz, a pastor in Grobin, and Dorothea Elizabeth Kolb, he was the brother of the sculptor Robert and nephew to another famous sculptor Eduard Schmidt von der Launitz. Little was known about the Launitz family’s (ru) history, the only known history was that first ever known ancestor was Jürgen Launitz, all what was known about him was that he was a landowner in Courland in the 16th Century. The commoner family was recognized with Holy Roman nobility in 1802, but it was not until 1817 then the family adopted the title Schmidt von der Launitz.

Family 
In 1842, Launitz married Baroness Mathilde Luise Henriette , they had 5 children including Michael, who was a hussar like his father. All of his children were baptized in Lutheran churches, although Michael soon came under the influence of his Russian Orthodox wife and converted to Orthodoxy.

Honours and awards 
  Order of St. Vladimir, 4th class (1829)
  Order of St. George, 4th class (11.12.1840)
  Golden Weapon with the inscription "For Bravery" (1831)
  Order of St. Stanislaus, 1st class
  Order of St. Anna, 1st class
  Order of St. Vladimir, 2nd class
  Order of the White Eagle

Notes

Citations

Sources 
 Welding, Olaf. Baltic German Biographical Dictionary 1710-1960. (1970), from the Baltic Biographical Dictionary Digital 

1802 births
1864 deaths
Baltic-German people
Military leaders of the Russian Empire